Manas Ranjan Bhunia is an Indian politician and was the Minister for Irrigation and Waterways and the Minister for Small & Micro Industries and Textile in the Government of West Bengal. He is also an MLA, elected from the Sabang constituency in the 2011 West Bengal state assembly election. He along with all other ministers in the state cabinet resigned after I.N.C. took back the support from the state government. He joined the All India Trinamool Congress in 2016. He is the current Minister of Water Resources Investigation and Development for the Government of West Bengal.

On 26 August 2015, he accused West Bengal police forces of selectively arresting supporters of the Chhatra Parishad movement.  On September 16, he began an indefinite fast to protest the murder of one of the movement's members. In March 2021, he again got the ticket to contest the West Bengal Assembly Election 2021 from Sabang constituency and won.

References 

Members of the West Bengal Legislative Assembly
Living people
State cabinet ministers of West Bengal
1952 births
Indian National Congress politicians from West Bengal
Trinamool Congress politicians from West Bengal